John Alexander (born October 26, 1945, in Beaumont, Texas) is an American painter. Alexander studied art at Lamar University in Beaumont and Southern Methodist University in Dallas. After teaching at the University of Houston from 1971 to 1978, he moved to New York.  (Tennant, Houston Chronicle, 2003).

Alexander’s work is influenced by his affection for the southern landscape. A painting called Lost Souls depicts Alexander’s cast of characters; various masked politicians, religious figures, skeletons, monkeys, and creatures, adrift in stormy waters. Alexander’s work ranges from the beautiful to the macabre. His thick paint and forceful linework is often the unifying trait throughout his work. Alexander is the creator of the Crystal Head Vodka skull bottle, and is a coowner of the company with actor and comedian Dan Aykroyd.

Exhibitions

John Alexander’s work can be found in the permanent collections of a number of museums, including the Corcoran Gallery of Art, Washington DC; the Dallas Museum of Art, Dallas; the Hirshhorn Museum, DC; the Los Angeles County Museum of Art, Los Angeles; the Meadows Museum, Dallas; The Metropolitan Museum of Art, New York; the Museum of Contemporary Art, Los Angeles; the Museum of Fine Arts, Houston; the Art Museum of Southeast Texas, Beaumont, Texas; the New Orleans Museum of Art, New Orleans; the Ogden Museum of Southern Art, New Orleans; and the Smithsonian American Art Museum, Washington, D.C., as well as other public and private collections worldwide.  Alexander was a 2013 recipient of the Guild Hall Lifetime Achievement Award.

References

External links 

1945 births
Living people
People from Beaumont, Texas
Landscape artists
Painters from New York (state)